Cardeto is a comune (municipality) in the Metropolitan City of Reggio Calabria in the Italian region Calabria, located about  southwest of Catanzaro and about  southeast of Reggio Calabria.   
Cardeto borders the following municipalities: Bagaladi, Reggio Calabria, Roccaforte del Greco.

References

Cities and towns in Calabria